Dale Chihuly (born September 20, 1941) is an American glass artist and entrepreneur. He is best known in the field of blown glass, "moving it into the realm of large-scale sculpture".

Early life 
Dale Patrick Chihuly was born on September 20, 1941, in Tacoma, Washington. His parents were George and Viola Chihuly; his paternal grandfather was born in Slovakia. In 1956, his older brother and only sibling George died in a Navy aviation training accident in Pensacola, Florida. Two years later in 1958, Chihuly's father died of a heart attack at the age of 51.

Chihuly had no interest in continuing his formal education after graduating from Woodrow Wilson High School in 1959. However, at his mother's urging, he enrolled at the College of Puget Sound. A year later, he transferred to the University of Washington in Seattle to study interior design. In 1961, he joined the Delta Kappa Epsilon fraternity (Kappa Epsilon chapter), and the same year he learned how to melt and fuse glass. In 1962, Chihuly dropped out of the university to study art in Florence. He later traveled to the Middle East where he met architect Robert Landsman. Their meeting and his time abroad spurred Chihuly to return to his studies. In 1963, he took a weaving class where he incorporated glass shards into tapestries. He received an award for his work from the Seattle Weavers Guild in 1964. Chihuly graduated from the University of Washington in 1965 with a Bachelor of Arts degree in interior design.

Chihuly began experimenting with glassblowing in 1965, and in 1966 he received a full scholarship to attend the University of Wisconsin–Madison. He studied under Harvey Littleton, who had established the first glass program in the United States at the university. In 1967, Chihuly received a Master of Science degree in sculpture. After graduating, he enrolled at the Rhode Island School of Design, where he met and became close friends with Italo Scanga. Chihuly earned a Master of Fine Arts degree in sculpture from the RISD in 1968. That same year, he was awarded a Louis Comfort Tiffany Foundation grant for his work in glass, as well as a Fulbright Fellowship. He traveled to Venice to work at the Venini factory on the island of Murano, where he first saw the team approach to blowing glass. After returning to the United States, Chihuly spent the first of four consecutive summers teaching at the Haystack Mountain School of Crafts in Deer Isle, Maine. In 1969, he traveled to Europe, in part to meet Erwin Eisch in Germany and Stanislav Libenský and Jaroslava Brychtová in Czechoslovakia.
Chihuly donated a portion of a large exhibit to his alma mater, the University of Wisconsin, in 1997 and it is on permanent display in the Kohl Center. In 2013 the university awarded him an Honorary Doctorate of Fine Arts.

Career

In 1971, with the support of John Hauberg and Anne Gould Hauberg, Chihuly co-founded the Pilchuck Glass School near Stanwood, Washington. Chihuly also founded the HillTop Artists program in Tacoma, Washington at Hilltop Heritage Middle School and Wilson High School.

In 1976, while Chihuly was in England, he was involved in a head-on car accident that propelled him through the windshield. His face was severely cut by glass and he was blinded in his left eye. After recovering, he continued to blow glass until he dislocated his right shoulder in 1979 while bodysurfing.

In 1983, Chihuly returned to his native Pacific Northwest where he continued to develop his own work at the Pilchuck Glass School, which he had helped to found in 1971. No longer able to hold the glassblowing pipe, he hired others to do the work. Chihuly explained the change in a 2006 interview, saying "Once I stepped back, I liked the view", and said that it allowed him to see the work from more perspectives, enabling him to anticipate problems earlier. Chihuly's role has been described as "more choreographer than dancer, more supervisor than participant, more director than actor". San Diego Union-Tribune reporter Erin Glass wrote that she "wonders at the vision of not just the artist Chihuly, but the very successful entrepreneur Chihuly, whose estimated sales by 2004 was reported by The Seattle Times as $29 million."

Chihuly and his team of artists were the subjects of the documentary . They were also featured in the documentary Chihuly in the Hotshop, syndicated to public television stations by American Public Television starting on November 1, 2008.

In 2010, the Space Needle Corporation submitted a proposal for an exhibition of Chihuly's work at a site in the Seattle Center, in competition with proposals for other uses from several other groups. The project, which sees the new Chihuly exhibition hall occupy the site of the former Fun Forest amusement park in the Seattle Center park and entertainment complex, received the final approval from the Seattle City Council on April 25, 2011. Called Chihuly Garden and Glass, it opened May 21, 2012.

2006 lawsuit 
In 2006, Chihuly filed a lawsuit against his former longtime employee, glassblower Bryan Rubino, and businessman Robert Kaindl, claiming copyright and trademark infringement. Kaindl's pieces used titles Chihuly had employed for his own works, such as Seaforms and Ikebana, and resembled the construction of Chihuly's pieces. Legal experts stated that influence on art style did not constitute copyright infringement. Chihuly settled the lawsuit with Rubino initially, and later with Kaindl as well.

Works 

Regina Hackett, a Seattle Post-Intelligencer art critic, provided a chronology of Chihuly's work during the 1970s, 1980s, and 1990s:

 1975: Navajo Blanket Series, in which patterns of Navajo blankets were painted onto glass
 1977: Northwest Coast Basket Series, baskets inspired by Northwest coast Indian baskets he had seen as a child
 1980: Seaform Series, transparent sculptures of thin glass, strengthened by ribbed strands of color
 1981: Macchia Series, featuring every color available in the studio
 1986: Persian Series, inspired by Middle East glass from the 12th- to 14th-century, featuring more restrained color and room-sized installations
 1988: Venetian Series, improvisations based on Italian Art Deco
 1989: Ikebana Series, glass flower arrangements inspired by ikebana
 1990: Venetian Series returns, this time in a more eccentric form
 1991: Niijima Floats, six-foot spheres of intricate color inspired by Japanese glass fishing floats from the island of Niijima from Chihuly's website
 1992: Chandeliers, starting modestly but by the middle of the decade involving a ton of glass orbs and shapes that in some works look like flowers, others like breasts, and still others like snakes. Chihuly has also produced a sizable volume of "Irish cylinders", which are more modest in conception than his blown glass works.

For his exhibition in Jerusalem, Israel, in 2000, in addition to the glass pieces, he had enormous blocks of transparent ice brought in from an Alaskan artesian well and formed a wall, echoing the stones of the nearby Citadel. Lights with color gels were set up behind them for illumination. Chihuly said the melting wall represented the "dissolution of barriers" between people. This exhibit holds the world record for most visitors to a temporary exhibit with more than 1.3 million visitors.

Galleries 
Chihuly's largest permanent exhibit is at the Oklahoma City Museum of Art. Other large collections can be found at the Morean Arts Center in St. Petersburg, Florida, and Chihuly Garden and Glass in Seattle, Washington.

Chihuly also maintains two retail stores in partnership with MGM Resorts International, one at the Bellagio on the Las Vegas Strip, and the other at the MGM Grand Casino in Macau.

Exhibitions 

          
2023Laguna Murano Chandalier: From the George R. Stroemple Collection, Lauren Rogers Museum of Art,

Permanent collections 

Chihuly's art appears in over 400 permanent collections all over the world, including in the United States, Canada, England, Israel, China, Singapore, the United Arab Emirates, and Australia.

Recognition 
In 1994, he received the Golden Plate Award of the American Academy of Achievement.
In 2006, he received the American Craft Council’s gold medal.
In 2011, he received the Fritz Redlich Alumni Award of the Institute of International Education.

References

Further reading

Bibliography 
 Chihuly Over Venice by William Warmus and Dana Self. Seattle: Portland Press, 1996.
Chihuly by Donald Kuspit. New York: Harry N. Abrams, 1998.
 The Essential Dale Chihuly by William Warmus. New York: Harry N. Abrams, 2000.
 Dale Chihuly:365 Days. Margaret L. Kaplan, Editor. New York: Harry N. Abrams, 2008.
Chihuly Drawing, illustrated by Chihuly, with an essay by Nathan Kernan. Portland Press, 2003,

External links 

 
 Chihuly Garden And Glass exhibition
 Seattle Times article on Dale Chihuly

American glass artists
20th-century American sculptors
21st-century American sculptors
21st-century American male artists
American male sculptors
American installation artists
Glassblowers
1941 births
Living people
Pacific Northwest artists
American people of Slovak descent
American people with disabilities
Artists from Seattle
Rhode Island School of Design alumni
Rhode Island School of Design faculty
University of Washington School of Art + Art History + Design alumni
University of Wisconsin–Madison College of Letters and Science alumni
Artists from Tacoma, Washington
Sculptors from Washington (state)
20th-century American male artists
Fulbright alumni